Cijulang Nusawiru Airport , also known as Pangandaran Airport, is an airport near Pangandaran, Pangandaran Regency, a city in the province of West Java on the island of Java in Indonesia.

Facilities
The airport is at an elevation of 16 feet above mean sea level. It has one runway designated 07/25 with an asphalt surface measuring 1,400 m. The airport is operated and managed by UPT Ditjen Hubud, an agency under the Ministry of Transportation, Indonesia.

Airlines and destinations

This airport is mostly used by Susi Air as a main base and maintenance facility.

References

External links 
Cijulang Nusawiru Airport, Indonesia Airport Global Website

Airports in West Java
Transport in West Java